Gay Asian Pacific Alliance
Genocide and Atrocities Prevention Act
Ground-to-Air Pilotless Aircraft